Espetada (also known as espetinho, especially in Brazil) is the Portuguese term used for the technique of cooking food on skewers, and for the dishes prepared that way. Espetada is a traditional dish in Portuguese cuisine.

In Portugal, espetadas can be prepared with different types of meat, as well as squid or fish, with monkfish being commonly used. The most common are beef or pork, or a mixture of the two. More recently, turkey or chicken is used. Often pieces of bell pepper, onion, and chouriço are placed between the meat pieces. Espatada is usually accompanied by white rice or potatoes, and salad.

In Madeira, beef on bay laurel skewers is a typical dish, with origins in the Strait of Câmara de Lobos. The meat, after being cut into cubes and before being grilled, is seasoned with salt, pepper, garlic and bay leaf. It is then cooked over hot coals or wood chips. Bolo do caco is usually eaten with it, or milho frito, fried squares or triangles of firmly set polenta, to soak up the juices of the meat.

The dish can be served on a skewer which hangs from a hook on a stand for presentation.

See also
 List of Portuguese dishes
 
 South African Sosatie

References 

Pork dishes
Grilled skewers
Madeiran cuisine
Portuguese cuisine
Brazilian cuisine
Beef dishes